Braban is a surname. Notable people with the surname include:

 Harvey Braban (1883–1943), British stage actor
 John Braban (died 1443), member of Parliament for Dover

See also
 Braben